Andrea Nannini (12 December 1944 – 1 March 2021) was an Italian volleyball player. He was part of the Italian teams that won the 1970 Summer Universiade and finished in eighth place at the 1976 Summer Olympics.

References

External links

1944 births
2021 deaths
Olympic volleyball players of Italy
Volleyball players at the 1976 Summer Olympics
Italian men's volleyball players
Universiade medalists in volleyball
Universiade gold medalists for Italy
Medalists at the 1970 Summer Universiade